The stately quadrille is the name given to set of constantly shifting alliances between the great powers of Europe during the 18th century. The ultimate objective was to maintain the balance of power in Europe to stop any one alliance or country becoming too strong. It takes its name from the quadrille, a dance in which the participants constantly swap partners.

The most widely cited instance was in 1756, when Britain and Austria abandoned their 25-year-long Anglo-Austrian Alliance and instead made new alliances with their former enemies, Prussia and France, respectively. That was known as the Diplomatic Revolution.

Background
Shifting alliances had long been a factor in European politics and were often regarded as responses to shifting power and threat. During the 16th century and the early 17th century, much of the emphasis in European politics had been on restricting the power of the Habsburgs in Spain and the Holy Roman Empire.

Under the reign of Louis XIV, France replaced the Habsburgs as the dominant power in Europe. France's rising power was challenged by the Europe-wide League of Augsburg in the Nine Years' War 1688-97. After a Bourbon monarch ascended to the Spanish throne, the League of Augsburg fought the French and Spanish in the War of the Spanish Succession, from 1702 to 1713, in an effort to restore the Habsburgs in Spain. The conflict resulted in Philip V remaining on the throne.

Quadrille

In the years immediately after the war, Britain and France, which were widely considered to have been the leaders of opposing coalitions in the last war, formed an Anglo-French Alliance and recognized that they shared temporary, mutual interests. In the years that followed, they managed to defeat a resurgent Spain, formerly a French ally, in the War of the Quadruple Alliance. Spain sought an alliance with Austria and gained it in 1725. 

By 1731, Britain and France were clearly drifting apart. A diplomatic initiative with Austria was begun by the British government, and a new Anglo-Austrian Alliance was created. Spain withdrew its friendship with Austria and eventually ended up allied to France again. 

In 1733, however the Anglo-Austrian Alliance seemed under threat, when the British failed to assist the Austrians in the War of the Polish Succession. Austria had to rely heavily on Russia for assistance and was forced to make huge concessions to Spain in the 1738 peace treaty. Britain realised that its failure to intervene had allowed France to become too strong.

In 1740, Prussia, an emerging power, attacked Austria. Britain and France soon became embroiled in the war, which ended in a stalemate in 1748, but Austria appeared to have lost most in the war. Despite extensive British funding, it was increasingly disillusioned about the Anglo-Austrian Alliance and began looking for a replacement.

In 1756, Austria did what was considered unthinkable by many by abandoning its British connection to form a new alliance with France. Fearing that Continental Europe would be destabilized and led to war, Britain made an alliance with Prussia at the Convention of Westminster in the hope that a new balance of power would prevent war.

Decline
The concept began to fade in the second half of the 18th century, as Britain and France became the dominant European powers. The failure to prevent the Seven Years' War, in which over a million died, was a major factor. States began to seek a more stable and long-lasting series of alliances: one of the most successful in the second half of the century was the Bourbon Family Compact between France and Spain, which endured throughout a number of major European conflicts, including the Wars of Austrian and Polish Successions and the Seven Years' War and endured past the American War of Independence in which French and Spanish support contributed towards British defeat.

After the Napoleonic Wars, a Concert of Europe was set up to create a forum for discussion rather than create shifting alliance patterns, which had a tendency to cause major wars. This was successful through most of the 19th century, until World War I collapsed the post-Napoleonic system amid increasingly acute nationalist tensions, which led to the formation of Germany and the collapse of the Austrian, Russian, and Ottoman empires.

See also
 Treaty of Versailles (1756), the document establishing an alliance between Austria and France
 Treaty of Paris (1763), one of the treaties which ended the Seven Years' War

Further reading
 Clark, Christopher. Iron Kingdom: The Rise and Downfall of Prussia 1600–1947. Penguin Books, 2007
 Simms, Brendan. Three Victories and a Defeat. Penguin Books, 2008.
 Strachan, Hew. The First World War. Simon & Schuster, 2006

International relations terminology
History of Europe